Norley Wood (or Norleywood) is a hamlet in the New Forest National Park of Hampshire, England.  It is in the civil parish of Boldre.   Its nearest town is Lymington, which lies approximately 3 miles (4.7 km) south-west from the village.

External links

Hamlets in Hampshire